Simon Asher (born 5 September 1967) is an Australian water polo player who competed in the 1988 Summer Olympics and in the 1992 Summer Olympics.

References

1967 births
Living people
Australian male water polo players
Olympic water polo players of Australia
Water polo players at the 1988 Summer Olympics
Water polo players at the 1992 Summer Olympics
20th-century Australian people